Sidney Fiske Kimball (1888 – 1955) was an American architect, architectural historian and museum director. A pioneer in the field of architectural preservation in the United States, he played a leading part in the restoration of Monticello and Stratford Hall Plantation in Virginia.

Over his nearly-30-year tenure as director of the Philadelphia Museum of Art, he moved the museum into its current building and greatly expanded its collections.

Biography

Kimball was born in Newton, Massachusetts on December 8, 1888.

He was educated at Harvard University, where he took both his bachelor's and master's degrees in architecture. Kimball was awarded a Sheldon Fellowship for travel to Europe in 1911 and passed his assistantship in the library to his sister Theodora Kimball Hubbard during his absence. This opportunity propelled his sister's career as the first Landscape Architecture Librarian at Harvard University. He then taught at the University of Illinois and the University of Michigan, receiving a Ph.D from the latter institution in 1915.
In 1919, Kimball was appointed to head the newly formed department of art and architecture at the University of Virginia. While at the University of Virginia, he served as the supervising architect for Memorial Gymnasium (built in 1924), and the McIntire Amphitheatre on grounds at the university. He also designed the campus of Woodberry Forest School.

In 1923, Kimball left the University of Virginia  to establish the Institute of Fine Arts at New York University. In 1925, he was appointed director of the Philadelphia Museum of Art, where he served until his retirement in January 1955. During his first year in Philadelphia, he lived in and restored the Mount Pleasant mansion. Kimball was a consultant on numerous other restoration projects, including Monticello, Gunston Hall, Stratford Hall, and Colonial Williamsburg.

Kimball continued to work on projects in Virginia. Kimball designed his own home, Shack Mountain, in Albemarle County, Virginia, not from far Monticello. Kimball used Jefferson's architectural principles as the basis of his design of Shack Mountain, short for Shackelford Mountain, the surname of a branch of Jefferson's descendants. Built in 1935–1936, Shack Mountain is a Jefferson-style pavilion, like Monticello, that is considered Kimball's masterpiece. Shack Mountain was designated a National Historic Landmark in 1992.

Fiske Kimball died in Munich, Germany, on August 14, 1955. He and his wife are buried at Monticello Memorial Gardens on Monticello Mountain, about a mile from Monticello. He is commemorated by the Fiske Kimball Fine Arts Library at the University of Virginia.

Marriage

Kimball married, in June 1913, Marie Christina Goebel (1889–1955), the half Dutch, half German daughter of Julius Goebel, a professor of Germanic languages at the University of Illinois. She eventually was the recipient of two Guggenheim Fellowships and served as Monticello's first curator (1944–55). She also wrote a three-volume biography of Jefferson.

Works
Thomas Jefferson, architect, Original Designs in the Collection of Thomas Jefferson Coolidge, Junior, 1916
A History of Architecture, 1918 (with George Harold Edgell )
Domestic Architecture of the American Colonies and of the early Republic, 1922
American Architecture, 1928
Mr. Samuel McIntire, Carver : The architect of Salem, 1940
The Creation of the Rococo, 1943
Great Paintings in America: One Hundred and One Masterpieces in Color, 1948 (with Lionello Venturi)

See also
List of Directors of the Philadelphia Museum of Art

References

Further reading
 Dr. Kimball and Mr. Jefferson, Hugh Howard, Bloomsbury, 2006.
 Thomas Jefferson, Architect: Original Designs in the Collection of Thomas Jefferson Coolidge, Junior, Fiske Kimball, 1916
 A History of Architecture, Fiske Kimball and George Harold Edgell, Harper & Brothers, New York, 1918
 Domestic Architecture of the American Colonies and of the Early Republic, Fiske Kimball, Charles Scribner's Sons, New York, 1922
 George & Mary Roberts, Triumph on Fairmount: Fiske Kimball and the Philadelphia Museum of Art, (Lippincott, 1959).

External links
 'Fiske Kimball', Thomas Jefferson's Monticello, monticello.org
 Fiske Kimball Papers, Philadelphia Museum of Art, Philadelphia, Pennsylvania
 'Fiske Kimball: Culmination and Legacy', University of Virginia

1888 births
1955 deaths
Artists from Newton, Massachusetts
Architects from Philadelphia
Preservationist architects
University of Illinois Urbana-Champaign faculty
University of Michigan faculty
University of Virginia faculty
New York University faculty
American curators
American architectural historians
American male non-fiction writers
20th-century American architects
20th-century American historians
Members of the American Philosophical Society
University of Michigan alumni
Harvard Graduate School of Design alumni
Directors of the Philadelphia Museum of Art
People from Albemarle County, Virginia
Historians from Pennsylvania
Historians from Massachusetts
20th-century American male writers
Historians from Virginia